Ulukışla railway station is a railway station in Ulukışla, Turkey. The station is located in the southern part of the town and consists of one side platform serving one track. A small freight yard is also present as the line sees heavy freight traffic. Ulukışla station is the northern starting point of the railway through the Cilician Gates, and thus historically played an important role in helping trains pass through the Taurus Mountains.

Ulukışla station was originally opened on 1 July 1911, by the Baghdad Railway. Ulukışla was used as a staging point to help further construction through the mountains, storing material, helper locomotives and workers.

TCDD Taşımacılık operates two daily intercity trains from Konya and Kayseri to Adana.

References

External links
TCDD Taşımacılık
Passenger trains
Ulukışla station information
Ulukışla station timetable

Railway stations in Niğde Province
Railway stations opened in 1911
1911 establishments in the Ottoman Empire